Anthony Burrows (born 14 April 1942) is an English pop singer and recording artist. As a prolific session musician, Burrows was involved in the production of numerous transatlantic hit singles throughout the late 1960s and early 1970s, most of which were one-hit wonders, including "Love Grows (Where My Rosemary Goes)" by Edison Lighthouse, "United We Stand" by Brotherhood of Man, "My Baby Loves Lovin'" by White Plains, "Gimme Dat Ding" by The Pipkins and "Beach Baby" by The First Class. During 1970, four singles by four different acts for whom he served as lead vocalist all charted at or near the top of the UK Singles Chart and additionally reached the top 20 in the United States.

Biography

Early Life 
Burrows was born in Exeter, Devon, England.

Early Career 
In the early 1960s, he was a member of The Kestrels, a vocal harmony group which also included the future songwriting team Roger Greenaway and Roger Cook.  Subsequently, he joined the Ivy League, singing lead on their last hit "Willow Tree", which peaked at UK No. 50 in 1966. Burrows was still with them when they metamorphosed into the Flower Pot Men.  The Flower Pot Men had only one hit, "Let's Go to San Francisco", which reached No. 4 on the UK Singles Chart in the autumn of 1967. 

However, Burrows had no involvement with the single, which was created in the studio by the band's producers.  He did feature on a few later Flower Pot Men singles which were not hits. Two founding members of Deep Purple, Jon Lord and Nick Simper, were also part of this early band for live shows.

One-hit wonder bands 
Later, Burrows sang the lead vocals on several other one-hit wonder songs under different group names, Edison Lighthouse's "Love Grows (Where My Rosemary Goes)" (February 1970); White Plains' "My Baby Loves Lovin'" (March 1970); the Pipkins' novelty song "Gimme Dat Ding" (April 1970); and the First Class' "Beach Baby" (July 1974). He also sang lead vocals on Brotherhood of Man's "United We Stand", which reached No. 10 on the UK chart and also reached No. 13 in the U.S. These songs were all recorded within nine months of each other, but were all released around the same time in early 1970.

A published interview with Burrows claims that he became the first (and still the only) recording artist to appear on BBC Television's Top of the Pops fronting three different group acts appearing almost sequentially in a single broadcast show: Edison Lighthouse (the No. 1 British-charted hit that week), White Plains, and Brotherhood of Man. However records show that this did not happen. He did, however, have two of his bands on the same Top of the Pops four times between 29 January and 26 February 1970. Appearing alongside Edison Lighthouse on the shows were Brotherhood of Man (29 January 1970 and 19 February 1970) and White Plains (12 February 1970 and 26 February 1970). The recordings of his appearances on 29 January, 5 February and 26 February 1970 are all still in existence.

Although he hit the top 40 as the lead singer of five different groups, he only managed to have one chart single as a solo artist in the US.

Solo 
In 1970, he hit the Billboard Hot 100 with "Melanie Makes Me Smile", which peaked at No. 87. As well as fronting various hit-making acts, Burrows has also contributed vocals as a session singer to many other hits, claiming to have sung on 100 top 20 hits in the 1970s.

Session works 
He has also recorded as a session harmony singer with Elton John on the songs "Levon" and "Tiny Dancer", with Cliff Richard, and James Last.

Awards 
In 2011, Burrows was awarded the BASCA Gold Badge Award in recognition of his contribution to music.

Discography

One-hit wonder singles 

1967: Let's Go to San Francisco (The Flower Pot Men)
1970: Love Grows (Where My Rosemary Goes) (Edison Lighthouse)
1970: My Baby Loves Lovin' (White Plains)
1970: Gimme Dat Ding (The Pipkins)
1970: United We Stand (Brotherhood of Man)
1974: Beach Baby (The First Class)

Other Singles
1970:  "Melanie Makes Me Smile" / "I'll Get Along Somehow Girl" (Bell 1103)
1970:  "I've Still Got My Heart, Jo" / "Every Little Move She Makes" (Bell 1124)
1971:  "The Humming Song" / "Recollections" (Bell 1140)
1971:  "I'll Always Come Up Smiling" / "Back Home" (Bell 1172)
1971:  "Hand Me Down Man" / "Country Boy" (Bell 1190)
1971:  "In The Bad Bad Old Days" / "In the Bad Bad Old Days" (Bell USA 45-116, promo)
1972:  "Rhythm of the Rain" / "Home Lovin' Man" (Bell 1235)
1973:  "Take Away the Feeling" / "Lazy Weekend"  (Ammo 103)
1974:  "Have You Had a Little Happiness Lately" / "Can't Live With You, Can't Live Without You" (Ammo 111)
1975:  "Run Joey Run" / "Girl I Used To Know" (RAK 216)
1976:  "Never Gonna Fall in Love Again" / "Changing" (as Magic featuring Tony Burrows) (Bus Stop Records 1036)
1976:  "Oh My Jo" / "Girl You've Got Me Going" (Bus Stop 1039)
1976:  "When My Little Girl Is Smiling" / "What Ya Gonna Do About Him" (DJM 10718)
1984:  "Three Chord Trick" / "Wake Up America" (as Heart to Heart with Stephanie de Sykes) (EMI 5461)

References

External links
 Tony Burrows interview
 45cat discography
 

1942 births
Living people
English male singers
English pop singers
English session musicians
Musicians from Exeter
The Ivy League (band) members
The Flower Pot Men members
The Kestrels members
Edison Lighthouse members
White Plains (band) members
The First Class members
Brotherhood of Man members
The Pipkins members